Milt Thomas is a United States author and novelist.  After 21 years in the music industry, Thomas began a writing career at age 50.  His biography of Hugh B. Cave, Cave of a Thousand Tales, was nominated for an International Horror Guild Award in 2004.

References

External links
Milt Thomas Interview NAMM Oral History Library (2004)

Year of birth missing (living people)
Living people
21st-century American novelists
American male novelists
21st-century American biographers
21st-century American male writers
American male biographers